The 1814 Vermont gubernatorial election for Governor of Vermont took place in September and October, and resulted in the election of Martin Chittenden to a one-year term.

The Vermont General Assembly met in Montpelier on October 13. The Vermont House of Representatives appointed a committee to review the votes of the freemen of Vermont for governor, lieutenant governor, treasurer, and members of the governor's council. The committee determined that neither Jonas Galusha nor Martin Chittenden had attained the majority required by the Vermont Constitution. In such cases, the governor is chosen by the combined vote of the Vermont General Assembly.

On October 14, the General Assembly met to select the governor. In secret balloting, Chittenden was elected to his second one-year term by a vote of 123 to 91, with one vote counted as scattering.

In the election for lieutenant governor, the legislature's canvassing committee determined that neither William Chamberlain nor Paul Brigham had attained a majority. According to contemporary newspaper articles, the vote totals were: Chamberlain, 16,648 (49.1%); Brigham, 16,598 (49.0%); scattering, 655 (1.9%). The contest was decided by the General Assembly, which elected Chamberlain to a second one-year term by a vote of 118 to 91.

Benjamin Swan was elected to a one-year term as treasurer, his fifteenth, though the vote totals were not recorded. Swan, a Federalist was also endorsed by the Democratic-Republicans, and so was effectively unopposed for reelection.

In the race for governor, the results of the popular vote were reported as follows.

Results

References

Vermont gubernatorial elections
gubernatorial
Vermont